Warly Ceriani (1903 – 3 May 1983 in Buenos Aires) was a classic Argentine actor who appeared in major Argentine films between 1938 and 1959.

Ceriani made almost 50 film appearances in Argentina between 1938 and 1959 appearing in films such as the 1942 Julio Irigoyen film Academia El Tango Argentino.

Selected filmography
 Our Land of Peace (1939)
 When the Heart Sings (1941)
 Academia El Tango Argentino (1942)
 His Best Student (1944)
 The Soul of a Tango (1945)
 Saint Candida (1945)
 Two Angels and a Sinner (1945)
 Passport to Rio (1948)
 The Marihuana Story (1950)
 The Unwanted (1951)
 La Bestia debe morir (1952)
 Behind a Long Wall (1958)

External links
 

1903 births
1983 deaths
Male actors from Buenos Aires
20th-century Argentine male actors
Argentine male film actors